Innocence is a lack of guilt, with respect to any kind of crime, sin, or wrongdoing, or else a lack of worldly understanding on sensitive issues such as crime and sexuality.

Innocence may also refer to:

Film 
 Innocence (1923 film), a 1923 American silent drama film
 Innocence (1997 film) (Masumiyet), a Turkish drama by Zeki Demirkubuz
 Innocence (2000 film), an Australian film by Paul Cox
 Innocence (2004 film), a French film by Lucile Hadžihalilović
 Innocence (2005 film), a Thai documentary
 Innocence (2011 film), (Nevinnost), a Czech film by Jan Hřebejk
 Innocence (2013 film), a 2013 film based on the book by the same name by Jane Mendelsohn
 Innocence (2020 film), a South Korean film
 Ghost in the Shell 2: Innocence, a 2004 anime film by Mamoru Oshii

Literature 
 "Innocence" (short story), a short story by Honoré de Balzac
 Innocence (Fitzgerald novel), a 1986 novel by Penelope Fitzgerald
 Innocence (Mendelsohn novel), a 2000 novel by Jane Mendelsohn

Music

Performers 
 Innocence (band), a 1990s British R&B band
 The Innocence, previously The Trade Winds, a 1960s American pop group

Albums 
 Innocence (Alisa Mizuki album), 1999
 Innocence (Kenny Barron album), 1978
 Innocence (Murray Head album), 1993
 Innocence (Sennen EP), 2010
 Innocence (Davichi EP), 2010
 Innocence (Pontiak album), 2014
 Innocence (Jena Irene Asciutto EP), 2016

Songs 
 "Innocence" (Björk song), 2007
 "Innocence" (Nero song), 2010
 "Innocence" (Tarja song), 2016
 "Innocence", a song by Avril Lavigne from The Best Damn Thing
 "Innocence", a song by Boney James from Sweet Thing
 "Innocence", a song by Deborah Blando from A Different Story
 "Innocence", a song by Disturbed from Asylum
 "Innocence", a song by Flume, featuring AlunaGeorge, from Skin
 "Innocence", a song by Harlequin
 "Innocence", a song by Hootie & the Blowfish from Hootie & the Blowfish
 "Innocence", a song by Jeremy Camp from Restored
 "Innocence", a song by Kirsty MacColl from Kite
 "Innocence", a song by Madeon, featuring Aquilo, from Adventure
 "Innocence", a song by Shaman from Reason

Television episodes 
 "Innocence" (Buffy the Vampire Slayer)
 "Innocence" (Law & Order)
 "Innocence" (Star Trek: Voyager)

Legal associations 
 Innocence Network, an affiliation of organizations dedicated to providing pro bono legal and investigative services
 Innocence Project, a non-profit legal organization committed to exonerating wrongly convicted people

See also 
 Innosense, a 1997–2003 American all-female pop group
 Innocent (disambiguation)
 The Innocents (disambiguation)
 Inocencio (disambiguation)
 Innocencio